The Arthur Ross Book Award is a politics-related literary award.

History and administration
It was endowed in 2001 by Arthur Ross, an American businessman and philanthropist, for the purpose of recognizing books that make an outstanding contribution to the understanding of foreign policy or international relations. The prize is for nonfiction works from the past two years, in English or translation, and is accompanied by a monetary award. The amount of the prize has varied from year to year but has sometimes consisted of a $30,000 "Gold Medal", a $15,000 "Silver Medal" and a $7,500 "Honorable Mention".

The award is administered by the Council on Foreign Relations, an American nonprofit nonpartisan membership organization, publisher and think tank specializing in U.S. foreign policy and international affairs.

List of winners

2000s
 2002
Gold Medal – Robert Skidelsky for John Maynard Keynes: Fighting for Freedom 1937–1946 
Silver Medal – Lawrence Freedman for Kennedy's Wars: Berlin, Cuba, Laos, and Vietnam 
Honorable Mention – Walter Russell Mead and Richard C. Leone for Special Providence: American Foreign Policy and How It Changed the World

 2003
Gold Medal – Samantha Power for A Problem from Hell: America and the Age of Genocide 
Silver Medal – Margaret MacMillan for Paris 1919: Six Months That Changed the World 
Honorable Mention – Philip Bobbitt for The Shield of Achilles: War, Peace, and the Course of History

2004
Gold Medal – Daniel Benjamin and Steven Simon for The Age of Sacred Terror: Radical Islam's War Against America 
Silver Medal – Robert Cooper for The Breaking of Nations: Order and Chaos in the Twenty-First Century 
Honorable Mention – Ivo H. Daalder and James M. Lindsay for America Unbound: The Bush Revolution in Foreign Policy

2005
Gold Medal – Steve Coll for Ghost Wars: The Secret History of the CIA, Afghanistan, and Bin Laden, from the Soviet Invasion to September 10, 2001 
Silver Medal – Stephen Biddle for Military Power: Explaining Victory and Defeat in Modern Battle 
Honorable Mention – James Mann for Rise of the Vulcans: The History of Bush's War Cabinet

2006
Gold Medal – Tony Judt for Postwar: A History of Europe Since 1945 
Silver Medal – Olivier Roy for Globalized Islam: The Search for a New Ummah 
Honorable Mention – George Packer for The Assassins' Gate: America in Iraq

2007
Gold Medal – Kwame Anthony Appiah for Cosmopolitanism: Ethics in a World of Strangers 
Silver Medal – Robert L. Beisner for Dean Acheson: A Life in the Cold War 
Honorable Mention – Thomas E. Ricks for Fiasco: The American Military Adventure in Iraq, 2003 to 2005

2008
Gold Medal – Paul Collier for The Bottom Billion: Why the Poorest Countries Are Failing and What Can Be Done About It 
Silver Medal – Trita Parsi for Treacherous Alliance: The Secret Dealings of Israel, Iran, and the United States 
Honorable Mention – Robert Dallek for Nixon and Kissinger: Partners in Power

2009
Gold Medal – Philip P. Pan for Out of Mao's Shadow: The Struggle for the Soul of a New China
Silver Medal – Ahmed Rashid for Descent into Chaos: The United States and the Failure of Nation Building in Pakistan, Afghanistan, and Central Asia
Honorable Mention – Gareth Evans for The Responsibility To Protect: Ending Mass Atrocity Crimes Once and for All

2010s
2010
Gold Medal – Liaquat Ahamed for Lords of Finance: The Bankers Who Broke the World
Silver Medal – Seth Jones for In the Graveyard of Empires: America's War in Afghanistan
Honorable Mention – Gérard Prunier for Africa's World War: Congo, the Rwandan Genocide, and the Making of a Continental Catastrophe

2011
Gold Medal – Carmen M. Reinhart and Kenneth Rogoff for This Time is Different: Eight Centuries of Financial Folly
Silver Medal – Thomas Hegghammer for Jihad in Saudi Arabia: Violence and Pan-Islamism since 1979
Honorable Mention – Charles A. Kupchan for How Enemies Become Friends: The Sources of Stable Peace

2012
Gold Medal – John Lewis Gaddis for George F. Kennan: An American Life
Silver Medal – Jason Stearns for Dancing in the Glory of Monsters: The Collapse of Congo and the Great War of Africa
Honorable Mention – Daniel Yergin for The Quest: Energy, Security, and the Remaking of the Modern World

2013
Gold Medal – Fredrik Logevall for Embers of War: The Fall of an Empire and the Making of America's Vietnam
Silver Medal – Anne Applebaum for Iron Curtain: The Crushing of Eastern Europe, 1944–1956 
Honorable Mention – Daron Acemoglu and James A. Robinson for Why Nations Fail: The Origins of Power, Prosperity, and Poverty

2014
Gold Medal – Gary Bass for The Blood Telegram: Nixon, Kissinger, and a Forgotten Genocide
Silver Medal – Carter Malkasian for War Comes to Garmser: Thirty Years of Conflict on the Afghan Frontier
Honorable Mention – Benn Steil for The Battle of Bretton Woods: John Maynard Keynes, Harry Dexter White, and the Making of a New World Order

2015
Gold Medal – Thomas Piketty for Capital in the Twenty-First Century
Silver Medal – Stephen Kotkin for Stalin: Paradoxes of Power, 1878–1928
Honorable Mention – Evan Osnos for Age of Ambition: Chasing Fortune, Truth, and Faith in the New China

2016
Gold Medal – Niall Ferguson for Kissinger: 1923–1968: The Idealist
Silver Medal – Thomas J. Christensen for The China Challenge: Shaping the Choices of a Rising Power 
Bronze Medal – Charles Moore for Margaret Thatcher: The Authorized Biography—Volume II: Everything She Wants

2017
Gold Medal – John Pomfret for The Beautiful Country and the Middle Kingdom: America and China, 1776 to the Present
Silver Medal – Robert F. Worth for A Rage for Order: The Middle East in Turmoil, From Tahrir Square to ISIS
Bronze Medal – Svetlana Alexievich for Secondhand Time: The Last of the Soviets

2018
Gold Medal – Stephen Kotkin for Stalin: Waiting for Hitler, 1929–1941
Silver Medal – Michael Green for By More Than Providence: Grand Strategy and American Power in the Asia Pacific Since 1783
Bronze Medal – Masha Gessen for The Future Is History: How Totalitarianism Reclaimed Russia

2019
Gold Medal – Jill Lepore for These Truths: A History of the United States
Silver Medal – Andrew Roberts for Churchill: Walking with Destiny
Bronze Medal – Max Hastings for Vietnam: An Epic Tragedy, 1945-1975

2020
Gold Medal – Patrick Radden Keefe for Say Nothing: A True Story of Murder and Memory in Northern Ireland
Silver Medal – George Packer for Our Man: Richard Holbrooke and the End of the American Century
Bronze Medal – William Dalrymple for The Anarchy: The East India Company, Corporate Violence, and the Pillage of an Empire

2021
Gold Medal – Zachary D. Carter for The Price of Peace: Money, Democracy, and the Life of John Maynard Keynes
Silver Medal – Peter Baker and Susan Glasser for The Man Who Ran Washington: The Life and Times of James A. Baker III
Bronze Medal – Robert Putnam and Shaylyn Romney Garrett for The Upswing: How America Came Together a Century Ago and How We Can Do It Again

2022
Gold Medal – Carter Malkasian for The American War in Afghanistan: A History
Silver Medal – Mary Elise Sarotte for Not One Inch: America, Russia, and the Making of a Post-Cold War Stalemate
Bronze Medal – Nicole Perlroth for This Is How They Tell Me the World Ends: The Cyberweapons Arms Race

See also

 List of literary awards
 List of politics awards

References

External links

2001 establishments in the United States
Annual events in the United States
Awards established in 2001

Foreign policy
American non-fiction literary awards
Recurring events established in 2001
Political book awards
Council on Foreign Relations